The Great Beauty is a 2013 art drama film co-written and directed by Paolo Sorrentino. Filming took place in Rome starting on 9 August 2012. It premiered at the 2013 Cannes Film Festival where it was screened in competition for the Palme d'Or. It was shown at the 2013 Toronto International Film Festival, the 2013 Tallinn Black Nights Film Festival (winning Grand Prix), and at the 2013 Reykjavik European Film Festival.

The film won Best Foreign Language Film at the 86th Academy Awards, as well as the Golden Globe and the BAFTA award in the same category. It is a co-production between the Italian Medusa Film and Indigo Film and the French Babe Films, with support from Banca Popolare di Vicenza, Pathé and France 2 Cinéma. With a production budget of €9.2 million, the film grossed over $24 million worldwide.

Plot
The film opens with a quote from Céline's novel Journey to the End of the Night: "Travel is useful; it exercises the imagination. All the rest is disappointment and fatigue. Our journey is entirely imaginary. That is its strength. It goes from life to death. People, animals, cities, things – all are imagined. It's a novel, just a fictitious narrative. Littré says so, and he's never wrong. And besides, in the first place, anyone can do as much. You just have to close your eyes. It's on the other side of life."

Jep Gambardella is a 65-year-old seasoned journalist and theater critic, a fascinating man, mostly committed to wandering among the social events of a Rome immersed in the beauty of its history and in the superficiality of its inhabitants today, in a merciless contrast. He also ventured into creative writing in his youth: he is the author of only one work called The Human Apparatus. Despite the appreciation and the many awards he received, Jep has not written other books, not only for his laziness but above all for a creative block from which he cannot escape. The purpose of his existence has been to become a "socialite", but not just any socialite, but "the king of society".

Jep is surrounded by several friends: Romano, a playwright who is perpetually on the leash of a young woman who exploits him; Lello, a mouthy and wealthy toy seller; Viola, a wealthy bourgeois and mother of a son with serious mental problems named Andrea who will commit suicide by crashing voluntarily with his car; Stefania, a self-centred radical chic writer; Dadina, the dwarf editor of the newspaper where Jep works.

One morning, he meets the husband of Elisa, a woman who has been Jep's first and probably only love: the man announces that Elisa has died, leaving behind only a diary in which the woman tells of her love for Jep; thus, her husband discovered that he had been a mere surrogate for 35 years, nothing more than "a good companion". Elisa's husband, now afflicted and grieved, will soon find consolation in the affectionate welcome of his foreign maid. After this episode, Jep begins a profound and melancholic reinterpretation of his life and a long meditation on himself and on the world around him. And, above all, he thinks about starting to write again.

During the following days, Jep meets Ramona, a stripper with painful secrets, and Cardinal Bellucci, in whom the passion for cooking is more alive than his Catholic faith; Jep is gradually convinced of the futility and uselessness of his existence. Soon his "vicious circle" also breaks down: Ramona, with whom he had established an innocent and profound relationship, dies of an incurable disease; Romano, disappointed by the deceptive attractiveness of Rome, leaves the city, farewelling only Jep; Stefania, humiliated by Jep, who had revealed her secrets and her lies to her face, left Jep's worldly circle; Viola, on the other hand, after the death of her son, donates all her possessions to the Church and becomes a missionary in Africa.

Just when hopes seem to abandon Jep once and for all, he is saved by a new episode: after a meeting, pushed by Dadina, who wants to get an interview with a "Saint", a Catholic missionary nun in the Third World, Jep goes to Giglio Island to report on the shipwreck of the Costa Concordia. Right here, remembering his first meeting with Elisa in a flashback, a glimmer of hope rekindles in him: his next novel is finally ready to come to light.

Cast

Music

Reception
The review aggregator website Rotten Tomatoes reported a 91% approval rating, based on 132 reviews, with a weighted average rating of 8.00/10. The website's critical consensus states, "Dazzlingly ambitious, beautifully filmed, and thoroughly enthralling, The Great Beauty offers virtuoso filmmaking from writer/director Paolo Sorrentino." The film holds a score of 86/100 on Metacritic based on 34 reviews, signifying "universal acclaim."

Robbie Collin at The Daily Telegraph awarded Sorrentino's film the maximum five stars and described it as "a shimmering coup de cinema". He likened it to Roberto Rossellini's Rome, Open City and Federico Fellini's La Dolce Vita in its ambition to record a period of Roman history on film. "Rossellini covered the Nazi occupation of 1944; Fellini the seductive, empty hedonism of the years that followed. Sorrentino's plan is to do the same for the Berlusconi era," he wrote. Deborah Young of The Hollywood Reporter stated "Sorrentino's vision of moral chaos and disorder, spiritual and emotional emptiness at this moment in time is even darker than Fellini's (though Ettore Scola's The Terrace certainly comes in somewhere)." Critics have also identified other purposefully explicit film homages: to Roma, 8½, Scola's Splendor, Michelangelo Antonioni's La notte. Spanish film director Pedro Almodóvar named the film as one of the twelve best films of 2013, placing it second in his list. In 2016, the film was ranked among the 100 greatest films since 2000 in an international critics poll by 177 critics around the world. It is currently director Paolo Sorrentino's second highest rated film on Rotten Tomatoes.

Film critics' top lists
Various critics named the film as one of the best of 2013.
1st: Time Out Londons 10 Best films of 2013
1st: Robbie Collin, The Daily Telegraph
2nd: Xan Brooks, The Guardian
2nd: Richard Corliss, Time
3rd: Chris Vognar, The Dallas Morning News
4th: Sight & Sound
4th: Lisa Schwarzbaum, BBC
6th: Jake Coyle, Associated Press
7th: Stephen Holden, The New York Times
8th: Simon Abrams & Alan Scherstuhl, The Village Voice
9th: Robert Gifford, The Diamondback
9th: Empires 50 Best Films Of 2013
Best films of 2013: Peter Bradshaw, The Guardian
Best Film of 2013: Justin Chang, Variety

Recognitions

See also
 List of submissions to the 86th Academy Awards for Best Foreign Language Film
 List of Italian submissions for the Academy Award for Best Foreign Language Film

Notes

References

External links
 
 
 
 
 
 The Great Beauty at Australian distributor Palace Films
 The Great Beauty: Dancing in Place – an essay by Phillip Lopate at The Criterion Collection

2013 films
2013 drama films
2010s Italian-language films
Best Foreign Language Film Academy Award winners
Best Foreign Language Film BAFTA Award winners
Best Foreign Language Film Golden Globe winners
European Film Awards winners (films)
Films about writers
Films directed by Paolo Sorrentino
Films set in Rome
Films shot in Rome
France 2 Cinéma films
French drama films
Italian drama films
Pathé films
Films with screenplays by Paolo Sorrentino
2010s French films